Türkeli is a town and district of Sinop Province in the Black Sea region of Turkey.
The town has a year-round population of about 7000 people, but in summer the population exceeds 10,000. Many natives of the town have emigrated to Germany, Austria, Belgium and France. The mayor is Halil Dilek Özcan (MHP). Türkeli is one of the districts of Sinop that produces walnuts.

References

Populated places in Sinop Province
Fishing communities in Turkey
Populated coastal places in Turkey
Districts of Sinop Province
Towns in Turkey